The poncelet (symbol p) is an obsolete unit of power, once used in France and replaced by  (ch, metric horsepower). The unit was named after Jean-Victor Poncelet.

One poncelet is defined as the power required to raise a hundred-kilogram mass (quintal) at a velocity of one metre per second (100 kilogram-force·m/s). 

 1 p = 980.665 W =  ch ≈ 1.315 hp (imperial horsepower)

References

Units of power
Obsolete units of measurement
Metrication in France